Louis VIII (German: Ludwig) (5 April 1691 – 17 October 1768) was the Landgrave of Hesse-Darmstadt from 1739 to 1768.  He was the son of Ernest Louis, Landgrave of Hesse-Darmstadt and Margravine Dorothea Charlotte of Brandenburg-Ansbach.

Life 

In 1717, he was married to Countess Charlotte Christine of Hanau-Lichtenberg and he received Hanau-Lichtenberg as an addition to his dominions. Because of his passion for hunting, he is known as the "Hunting Landgrave" (German: Jagdlandgraf).  During the Seven Years' War he stood on the side of the Emperor and received the rank of General Field Marshal.

Like his father, Louis was not a gifted economist and only his good relationship with Empress Maria Theresa and her intervention at the Imperial Court Council kept the Landgraviate from bankruptcy.  However, his caring for his country is documented by the establishment of a textile house in 1742 and a state orphanage in the 1746.

Issue 
Children:
 Landgrave Louis IX, married in 1741 Countess Palatine Caroline of Zweibrücken, had issue
 Prince George William, married in 1748 Countess Maria Louise Albertine of Leiningen-Dagsburg-Falkenburg, had issue
 Princess Caroline Louise;  married in 1751 Charles Frederick, Margrave of Baden, later first Grand Duke of Baden, had issue

Ancestors

External links

 The Age of Absolutism in Hesse-Darmstadt (German)

Sources

 Die Geschichte Hessens, Gerd Bauer, Heiner Boencke, Hans Sarkowicz; Eichborn, 2002, p. 193-194

|-

1691 births
1768 deaths
Nobility from Darmstadt
Landgraves of Hesse-Darmstadt
Generals of the Holy Roman Empire